Panait Mușoiu (18 November 1864 – 14 November 1944) was a Romanian anarchist and socialist activist, the author of the first Romanian translation of The Communist Manifesto. He was one of the main figures of anarchism in Romania and the founder of several left-wing magazines (Munca, Mișcarea socială, Revista ideei) in which he published articles on political and social issues.

Bibliography
 Propaganda în mişcarea socială (1891)
 Determinismul social (1892)
 Despre mişcarea socialistă (1893)
 Metoda experimentală în politică (1893)
 Scrieri (posthumously, 1976)

Further reading
 Martin Veith, Unbeugsam - Panait Mușoiu - ein Pionier des rumänischen Anarchismus, Lich, 2013 (German)
 Gălățeanu, A., Gogoneață, Nicolae: Evocări - Panait Mușoiu, 216p., Editura Politică, București, 1970.

References

External links
  Revista Ideei archives
 Presentation of content of the biographical book of Panait Mușoiu

1864 births
1944 deaths
Romanian anarchists
Romanian socialists